Gabriel Knight: Sins of the Fathers is a 1993 point-and-click adventure game, developed and published by Sierra On-Line for MS-DOS, Macintosh, and Windows, and released on December 17, 1993. The CD-ROM version features the voice talents of Tim Curry, Mark Hamill, Michael Dorn, Efrem Zimbalist, Jr., and Leah Remini. The game's story focuses on Gabriel Knight, a struggling novelist and owner of a rare book store in New Orleans, who opts to research a recent spate of murders around the city that have a connection to voodoo. In the process, he is slowly revealed to be a descendant of a German family who are involved in combatting people who use supernatural forces, and discovers a link between the killings and his family's past.

The game's production was handled by Jane Jensen, with assistance from veteran game designer Roberta Williams. Critics gave favorable reviews of Gabriel Knight, with praise to the voice cast and story. While the game was not a commercial success, it spawned a series, with a sequel, titled The Beast Within: A Gabriel Knight Mystery, released in 1995. A remake of the game to mark its 20th anniversary, titled Gabriel Knight: Sins of the Fathers 20th Anniversary Edition, was released on October 15, 2014, for Windows, Mac, iPad, and Android. The remake featured a remastering of graphics and music, a new voice cast, and minor changes in the arrangement of events.

Gameplay 

Sins of the Fathers is a point-and-click adventure game, played from a third-person perspective. While its story unfolds over a linear sequence of chapters - each covering the course of a day - which have a required set of actions that must be performed to make progress, gameplay is mostly non-linear and features additional optional actions that can be conducted, some of which provide further insight into the background of the story and its setting. In tune with Sierra games of the time, a running score is used to keep check on actions, both required and optional, that players have completed (i.e. talking about a key subject with a character). This also includes locations that need to be visited, which hold the key actions required to complete a chapter. In some chapters, the player may be required to complete an action that avoids a game-over situation - like Sierra games of the time, failing to overcome a dangerous situation ends the game, forcing players to either retry, restart, or reload to a previous save game.

Unlike newer graphical adventure games that use context-sensitive cursors which conduct the appropriate action when interacting with objects and people, the game makes use of action-specific cursors which perform the required action the player needs, provided they select that action's icon from the game-bar - "WALK", "LOOK", "ASK", "TALK", "PICKUP", "OPEN/CLOSE", "OPERATE", and "MOVE". Items that can be collected from a location in the game, are stored in an inventory where they can be examined, interacted with, or combined with other items being carried. More importantly, items can be made an active icon in the game-bar, functioning in a similar manner to action icons by allowing it to be used with interactive objects in the game world.

Conversations with people differ depending on which conversation action is used: TALK functions as a short, general, interaction with most characters; while ASK functions with specific main characters, in which players can ask them about various topics. Topics are divided between Global, which lists items that can be generally asked of any main character, and Specific, which list items that can be asked of the relevant character. Any conversations can be revisited by using the RECORDER icon in the game-bar, allowing players to re-examine conversations for information they may have forgotten about. Other functions of the game bar include CONTROLS and HELP, which help to provide insight on the game functions and adjust settings. To visit other locations when leaving the current one, an overhead map is provided in most chapters, with icons representing the locations that can be visited; a HINT system is provided, allowing players to know where they need to go to complete required actions.

Story

Setting
Sins of the Fathers takes place within a world where supernatural forces, both good and evil, have existed throughout human history, with any becoming a threat to humanity being combatted by people who specialize in fighting such powers. The story incorporates the mythology, history and background of voodoo - both the Amercanized version found in Louisiana, and the West African version - mixing real elements with a fictionalized version that is central to the game's plot. Locations featured include the real-life city of New Orleans, United States, the fictional town of Rittersberg, Germany, and a fictional burial mound situated within Benin.

Plot
Gabriel Knight, a struggling novelist owning a book store in the French Quarter of New Orleans, seeks material for a new novel by researching a spate of killings across the city, dubbed the "Voodoo Murders", with the aid of his shop assistant Grace Nakimura, and the support of his childhood friend Frank Mosely, a police detective investigating the murders. At the site of a recent murder, Gabriel meets Malia Gedde, a local socialite passing by, and becomes infatuated with her, to the point that he uses deception to meet with her during the course of his investigations. His work soon leads him into understanding more about the practices of Louisiana Voodoo through a meeting with two experts on the subject: Dr. John, a voodoo museum curator; and Professor Hartridge, a researcher into voodoo practices. His investigations determine that the police's assumption on mob-based killings is wrong, and that the killer is someone who really practices voodoo.

At the same time, Gabriel visits his grandmother to talk to her about his family's past. He learns his grandfather, Harrison Knight, was a German-immigrant born as Heinz Ritter, who felt his family were crazy over the things they claimed to do and left them in order to raise his son Phillip, Gabriel's father, with a normal life. Harrison died when Phillip was eight, shortly after seeing his son develop a strange compulsion to draw and paint dark imagery, leaving him and his mother with debts. Phillip eventually married the wealthy Margaret Templeton, clearing most of his debts while she gave birth to Gabriel. However, both parents died when Gabriel was eight, leaving him to be raised by his grandmother, with Margaret leaving a trust fund he would use to open his store. Shortly after learning of his past, Gabriel is contacted by his great uncle Wolfgang Ritter who invites Gabriel to come to Germany and learn about his heritage at Schloss Ritter, their ancestral castle in Rittersberg, Germany.

Gabriel declines but agrees to accept a family journal from Wolfgang regarding an ancestor of his called Gunter Ritter. An entry in the journal catches his attention, detailing a case in which Gunter fought a voodoo practitioner named Tetelo, and had them burned at the stake for committing several crimes, prompting him to wonder if it relates to a recurring nightmare that appears to have similar elements in it. His suspicions of a voodoo murderer in New Orleans are heightened when a suspect questioned by Mosely is later murdered in front of Gabriel, while Hartridge is found dead after looking into an element of voodoo Gabriel had copied from a crime scene. After a python at Dr. John's museum attacks him, Gabriel shows his evidence to Mosely, including a newspaper article from 1810 describing a similar murder, and snake scales that link Dr. John to the crimes.

When Mosely disappears soon afterwards, Gabriel decides to infiltrate a voodoo cartel Dr. John is linked to, upon learning of their next meeting. During a ceremony, he witnesses that Malia is the cartel's leader, but that she is possessed by a Loa spirit that was once Tetelo, who recognizes Gabriel as a descendant of Gunter and proclaims him a "witch-hunter". Narrowly avoiding being killed, Gabriel is rescued by Grace and taken to safety. Needing to understand more about Tetelo, Gabriel agrees to meet with Wolfgang, and travels to his family's ancestral home in Rittersberg, Germany. Once there, Gabriel learns that the Ritters work as "Schattenjägers" - the German translation of "Shadow Hunters" - who are tasked with fighting those who threaten others through supernatural means, and that supernatural elements such as vampires, witches and demons exist. Learning from his great-uncle's assistant, Gerde, that Wolfgang left to locate a family heirloom that Tetelo stole from Gunter, Gabriel decides to undergo the initiation ritual to become a Schattenjäger.

Upon successfully completing the ritual, Gabriel gains access to a hidden library, whereupon he learns Tetelo likely holds the heirloom - a talisman with immense power - amongst her remains within a mound in Benin. He immediately travels after Wolfgang, and finds him wounded within the zombie-guarded mound. They discover the talisman is sealed within a sacrificial table. Wolfgang, believing Gabriel is the only one who can stop Tetelo, sacrifices himself to allow his great-nephew access to the talisman. After escaping the mound, Gabriel swears revenge on Tetelo. Upon his return to New Orleans, he finds the city battling terrible storms, rising crime rates, and widespread food poisoning and death.

A letter found at his book store from Malia reveals Tetelo now has control of her body, and urges Gabriel to flee the city for his safety, revealing that Grace was kidnapped by the cartel. Mosely soon arrives, having been in hiding after suspecting that the cartel has full control over the police and local government. The pair determine to rescue Grace and shut down the cartel by finding evidence to be sent to the FBI. After finding the cartel's hideout - a hidden voodoo temple - Gabriel locates Grace and has Mosely take her to safety, while he pursues after Malia. Confronting her, he uses his new power to bring down a stone idol that empowers the cartel, killing Dr. John, while leaving Malia, possessed by Tetelo, clinging to the edge of a fissure in the ground.

At this point, the story features two endings. If Gabriel opts to fulfil his duty, Malia heeds Tetelo's warning that he would kill her and pulls both of them into the fissure to die, with Mosely reflecting on Gabriel's heroism, despite Grace wondering if the world would be safe without Schattenjägers. If Gabriel opts to act with mercy and help Malia (considered the canonical option in the series), Malia reflects that Tetelo's warning was false and understands the Loa spirit is a threat to the world, thus she lets herself fall to her death to end the Loa's hold. With the cartel destroyed, Gabriel  reflects on his new status as a Schattenjäger, while Grace wonders if she should postpone returning to school in order to help him fight evil, slowly seeing that both have a new beginning in life.

Development 

The game was created and directed by writer Jane Jensen, who also worked on King's Quest VI: Heir Today, Gone Tomorrow. She developed the product with veteran game designer Roberta Williams. Jensen's husband Robert Holmes was a producer and composed the music.

The programmers for Gabriel Knight: Sins of the Father were Bob Andrews, Tom DeSalvo, Jerry Shaw, Sean Mooney, and Greg Tomko-Pavia. Graphic Designer was Nathan Gams. The artists included Michael Hutchison, Chris Willis, Darlou Gams, Deanna Vhalkee, and John Schroades. Audio Engineers were Kelli Spurgeon and Rick Spurgeon. Stuart M. Rosen worked as Voice Director.

The plot and atmosphere of Gabriel Knight: Sins of the Fathers was inspired by the film Angel Heart. Game designer/director Jane Jensen recalled that she was given a great deal of freedom in creating the game's concept: "One of the great things about Sierra was that Ken Williams really believed in the artistic vision. If he gave you the chance to do a game, that was your responsibility. Nobody told you what to do with it. If it didn't sell, then you wouldn't do another game for him, but he would let you have that freedom".

During development, Sierra's SCI game engine was upgraded to "SCI 32", and the team struggled to switch Gabriel Knight onto the new engine. Because of this, Jensen later wrote that they "fought bugs and snafus for six months. Despite this, we made our Christmas date – it just made what had been a very smooth project a bear".

Release 
Gabriel Knight: Sins of the Fathers was first released in North America by Sierra On-Line cross-format as both a single CD-ROM disc and as a set of eleven 3.5" floppy disks on December 17, 1993. The comic book prequel included with the physical copy of the game, was later posted in Sierra Studios's page. The CD-ROM version, besides voice acting, also included video sequences that, in the floppy version were included as a sequence of still images. The game has been subsequently re-released both individually and as Gabriel Knight Mysteries: Limited Edition, a compilation with the first sequel, The Beast Within: A Gabriel Knight Mystery.

Release Listings:

MAC – Gabriel Knight: Sins of the Fathers (US) – 1994 
PC – Gabriel Knight: Sins of our Fathers (US) – 1993 
PC – Best of Sierra No. 1 (UK) – 1997 
PC – Gabriel Knight Mysteries: Limited Edition (US) – 1998 
PC – Gabriel Knight: Sins of the Fathers (Good Old Games) (US) – 2010

Novel adaptation 
In 1997, Sins of the Fathers was adapted into a novel by Jane Jensen. The novel is a straightforward adaptation of the events of the game, an approach which Jane Jensen decided, in retrospect, was not the most successful way of introducing Gabriel Knight to a literary audience. For the novel adaptation of the second game she "threw the whole idea of the game away and started again from scratch". Both books are out of print as of 2010. As part of her 2012 Kickstarter campaign to fund a new adventure game, Jensen offered both Gabriel Knight novels as ebooks to backers who pledge $50 or more.

Reception 

Gabriel Knight was not a major commercial hit. According to Todd Vaughn of PC Gamer US, "Jensen's hope for a King's Quest-sized success fell a little short of the mark". The game and its sequel, The Beast Within: A Gabriel Knight Mystery, sold a total of 300,000 copies by December 1998.

When previewing the game in November 1993, Computer Gaming Worlds Johnny L. Wilson stated the opening sequence "was the first time I've actually experienced fear when viewing a computer game". He wrote that "Gabriel Knight is an exceptional blend of art, game and understanding. It is mature audiences for all the right reasons". In March 1994, the magazine's Charles Ardai stated that Gabriel Knight justified being called an interactive movie, with "audio and video that outshines any cartoon and a story that could scare the bejeebers out of Stephen King ... one of the rare titles that lives up to the promise of the overhyped tag 'multimedia'". He praised the "exceptionally well-performed game"'s voice actors, but observed that the large conversation trees reduced the horror and tension. Ardai liked how "Gabriel Knight throws the player convincingly into the world of satanism and live sacrifice, of seedy and lecherous New Orleans", predicting that "Gabriel has the makings of a first-rate series character, albeit a troubled and disturbing one". He concluded that the game "is really a preposterous bit of silliness" but "top-notch Hollywood-quality entertainment". In April 1994 the magazine said that the CD version - "the only one to own" - was "challenging and thought-provoking, an experience not to be missed, for those mature enough to handle it". Power Unlimited gave the game a score of 79% commenting: "The further you penetrate New Orleans, city of Voodoo, the more exciting it becomes. Although there is a lot of clicking and the music is very disappointing, the game is still very absorbing."

In June 1994 Gabriel Knight and Day of the Tentacle won Computer Gaming Worlds Adventure Game of the Year award. The editors wrote that the former "introduced elements from graphic novels ... nightmarish dream sequences and a dark human story that reads and plays extremely well". Virginia Capers won the Best Female Voice-Over Acting award. The editors had expected to give the award to someone portraying a specific character but were "totally overwhelmed" by Capers as the narrator, stating that "her performance alone makes it worthwhile to purchase the CD version". In 1996 the magazine listed a zombie ripping out the player's heart as #7 on its list of "the 15 best ways to die in computer gaming".

In 2011, Adventure Gamers named Gabriel Knight the 16th-best adventure game ever released.

20th Anniversary Edition 

Gabriel Knight: Sins of the Fathers 20th Anniversary Edition was made for the PC and Mac. It was developed by Jane Jensen's new studio Pinkerton Road Studios and released by Phoenix Online Studios on October 15, 2014. The reimagining includes improved graphics, a remastered soundtrack, and new puzzles and game play. A version of the game for Android and iOS was released on July 23, 2015. A Linux version was said to be coming at the time of the game's announcement but the statement was later retracted.

MP3 soundtrack was unlocked for all buyers in 2013-12-13.

Development 
The development was announced when Jane Jensen solicited a Kickstarter campaign to fund development of 3 games. The Kickstarter page included a US$16 pledge level listed 'Mystery Game X', which is also included in all the exceeding pledge levels. The campaign's funding level has never reached the $600,000 needed to justify developing Mystery Game X, so the game was developed without crowdfunding campaign.

Adaptations 
Series creator Jane Jensen created a 3-part comic based on the 20th Anniversary Edition video game, which took place six months after his last quest, "The Temptation". Chapter 1 was released on 17 December 2014. Chapter 2 was later released with Chapter 1 in single file. Chapter 3 was released with Chapters 1 and 2 in single file.

20th Anniversary voice cast 
 Jason Victor - Gabriel Knight
 Cissy Jones - Grace Nakimura, Madame Lorelei
 Ned Clarke - Detective Mosely
 Amy Ingersol - Malia Gedde, Tetelo
 Amy Kelly - Narrator
 Dave Fennoy - Dr. John, The Dragon
 Jeanie Kelsey - Grandma Knight
 Terry McGovern - Wolfgang Ritter
 Mark Barbolak - Professor Hartridge
 Alexandra Matthew - Gerde, Officer Franks
 Ruby Butterfield - Gunter Ritter
 Leah Russo - Magentia Moonbeam
 Adam Harrington - Desk Sgt. Frick, Willy Walker, Markus, Bruno
 Kid Beyond - Bartender, Watchman
 Brian Vickers - Sam

References

External links

20th Anniversary Edition 
 Phoenix Online Studios LLC page (Mac OS X/Windows)
 iOS page
 Android page

1993 video games
Adventure games
Android (operating system) games
Benin in fiction
Bookstores in fiction
Cajuns in video games
Classic Mac OS games
DOS games
Fiction about Louisiana Voodoo
Gabriel Knight
Games commercially released with DOSBox
IOS games
MacOS games
Point-and-click adventure games
ScummVM-supported games
Single-player video games
Video games about curses
Video games about witchcraft
Video games developed in the United States
Video games set in 1993
Video games set in Africa
Video games set in Germany
Video games set in Louisiana
Video games set in New Orleans
Windows games
Video games with alternate endings